Pressure relief may refer to:
 stress management to relieve psychological stress on a human 
 relieving excessive pressure forces to protect a mechanical system, typically using a pressure-relief device such as a safety valve or rupture disc